Aleš Poplatnik (born 25 June 1987) is a Slovenian footballer who plays for Škofja Loka as a forward.

Personal life
His younger brother, Matej Poplatnik, is also a professional footballer.

References

External links
NZS profile 

1987 births
Living people
Slovenian footballers
Association football forwards
NK Svoboda Ljubljana players
NK Olimpija Ljubljana (2005) players
NK Triglav Kranj players
Slovenian Second League players
Slovenian PrvaLiga players
Slovenian expatriate footballers
Slovenian expatriate sportspeople in Austria
Expatriate footballers in Austria